The One Hundred Twenty-first Ohio General Assembly was the legislative body of the state of Ohio in 1995 and 1996. In this General Assembly, both the Ohio Senate and the Ohio House of Representatives were controlled by the Republican Party.  In the Senate, there were 20 Republicans and 13 Democrats. In the House, there were 56 Republicans and 43 Democrats.

Major events

Vacancies
January 3, 1995: Senator Robert Ney (R-20th) resigns to take a seat in the United States House of Representatives.
January 4, 1995: Representative Tim Greenwood (R-51st) resigns to take a seat in the Ohio Senate.
January 3, 1995: Senator Betty Montgomery (R-2nd) resigns to become Ohio Attorney General.
March 31, 1995: Senator Bob Nettle (D-28th) resigns.
June 30, 1995: Senator Barry Levey (R-4th) resigns.
July 11, 1995: Representative Scott Nein (R-58th) resigns to take a seat in the Ohio Senate.
October 5, 1995: Senator Tim Greenwood (R-2nd) resigns.
October 5, 1995: Representative Ron Suster (D-14th) resigns to take a seat on the Cuyahoga County Court of Common Pleas.
December 31, 1995: Representative Madeline Cain (D-17th) resigns.
December 31, 1995: Representative Joseph Koziura (D-61st) resigns to become Mayor of Lorain, Ohio.
March 31, 1996: Senator Cooper Snyder (R-14th) resigns.
April 15, 1996: Representative Doug White (R-88th) resigns to take a seat in the Ohio Senate.

Appointments
January 3, 1995: James E. Carnes is appointed to the 20th Senatorial District due to the resignation of Bob Ney.
January 3, 1995: Tim Greenwood is appointed to the 2nd Senatorial District due to the resignation of Betty Montgomery.
January 4, 1995: Lynn Olman is appointed to the 51st House District due to the resignation of Tim Greenwood.
March 29, 1995: Leigh Herington is appointed to the 28th Senatorial District due to the resignation of Bob Nettle.
July 11, 1995: Scott Nein is appointed to the 4th Senatorial District due to the resignation of Barry Levey.
October 5, 1995: Steve Yarbrough is appointed to the 2nd Senatorial District due to the resignation of Tim Greenwood.
October 5, 1995: Gary Cates is appointed to the 58th House District due to the resignation of Scott Nein.
October 5, 1995: Ed Jerse is appointed to the 14th House District due to the resignation of Ron Suster.
January 6, 1996: Dan Brady is appointed to the 17th House District due to the resignation of Madeline Cain.
January 9, 1996: Dan Metelsky is appointed to the 61st House District due to the resignation of Joseph Koziura
April 16, 1996: Doug White is appointed to the 14th Senatorial District due to the resignation of Cooper Snyder.
April 16, 1996: Dennis Stapleton is appointed to the 88th House District due to the resignation of Doug White.

Senate

Leadership

Majority leadership
 President of the Senate: Stanley Aronoff
 President pro tempore of the Senate: Richard Finan
 Assistant pro tempore: Eugene J. Watts
 Whip: Robert R. Cupp

Minority leadership
 Leader: Robert Boggs
 Assistant Leader: Ben Espy
 Whip: Linda J. Furney
 Assistant Whip: Bob Nettle

Members of the 121st Ohio Senate

House of Representatives

Leadership

Majority leadership
 Speaker of the House: Jo Ann Davidson
 President pro tempore of the House: William G. Batchelder
 Floor Leader: Randy Gardner
 Assistant Majority Floor Leader: Scott Nein
 Majority Whip: Bob Corbin
 Assistant Majority Whip: Jim Buchy

Minority leadership
 Leader: Patrick Sweeney
 Assistant Leader: Jane Campbell
 Whip: Otto Beatty Jr.
 Assistant Whip: Ronald Gerberry

Members of the 121st Ohio House of Representatives

Appt.- Member was appointed to current House Seat

See also
Ohio House of Representatives membership, 126th General Assembly
Ohio House of Representatives membership, 125th General Assembly
 List of Ohio state legislatures

References
Ohio House of Representatives official website
Project Vote Smart – State House of Ohio
Map of Ohio House Districts
Ohio District Maps 2002–2012
2006 election results from Ohio Secretary of State

Ohio legislative sessions
Ohio
Ohio
1995 in Ohio
1996 in Ohio
de:Repräsentantenhaus von Ohio